"That's the Way" is a folk rock ballad by English rock band Led Zeppelin from their third album, Led Zeppelin III, released in 1970.  As with several of the tracks on the album, it is an acoustic song.

Composition
Jimmy Page and Robert Plant wrote the piece in 1970 on a retreat at Bron-Yr-Aur cottage, Wales. Page noted that the two developed it and recorded a rough demo after a long walk before they returned to the cottage.

The original working title of the song was "The Boy Next Door". On the surface, the lyrics are about one boy's parents being against a friendship with another boy due to his long hair and coming from the wrong side of town.  It also reflects on the group's early American tours, when they were sometimes harassed for their appearance.

Instrumentation for the song is spare, consisting of a strummed twelve-string acoustic guitar, with overdubbed mandolin and steel guitar fills; percussion and bass are absent from much of the song until the instrumental outro. According to Page, "And right at the end, where everything opens up, I played a dulcimer." He also plays the bass heard at the conclusion: "I was doing a bunch of overdubs and got excited. [Bassist] John Paul Jones went home, so I put the bass part on it as well! [laughs] That didn't happen often, believe me!"

Reception
In a contemporary review of Led Zeppelin III, Lester Bangs of Rolling Stone describes "That's the Way" as the first Led Zeppelin song that has ever truly moved him. Bangs praises the understated, but  effective acoustic guitar and vocal approach.  In a later review for AllMusic, Denise Sullivan calls it "one of Led Zeppelin's most beautiful ballads (in the true tradition of the folk ballad)".

See also
List of cover versions of Led Zeppelin songs "That's the Way" entries

References

Sources

Led Zeppelin songs
1970 songs
Songs written by Jimmy Page
Songs written by Robert Plant
Song recordings produced by Jimmy Page